Training Ship Chanakya (also known as T.S. Chanakya or Indian Maritime University, Navi Mumbai Campus)  located near the city of Mumbai, is a shore based successor to the Training Ship Rajendra (1972–1993) & Training Ship Dufferin (1927–1972), is situated off Palm beach road in an area of about .  T.S. Chanakya is the oldest and most renowned maritime academy in India.

Introduction 

Training Ship Chanakya is unit of the Mumbai campus of Indian Maritime University. It offers various training programs but the most respected is its flagship degree course i.e. the three-year degree program. The entry in this training institute is through Combine Entrance Exam conducted by Indian Maritime University.  Graduates from T.S. Chanakya receive a B.Sc. (Nautical Sciences) degree from the Indian Maritime University, and are eligible to seek employment on Indian or Foreign going ships. Currently it is also called as Mumbai campus of Indian Maritime University, Chennai. T.S. Chanakya (1993 - till Date) is a progeny of T.S. Rajendra (1972–1993) and T.S. Dufferin (1927–1972). The earlier two were actual ships floating at Ferry Wharf, Mumbai while T.S. Chanakya is a shore based academy in Navi Mumbai. The entire Indian Shipping and Logistics Fraternity and Indo-origin seafaring community across world is majorly thronged by ex-cadets of this community also called as DRACEA (Dufferin Rajendra And Chanakya Ex-Cadets Association). The members of DRACEA are at very high posts in maritime sector. Recently, T.S. Chanakya is also hitting limelight in non-shipping industries because of the ex-cadets who leave merchant navy career after significant experience at sea and go on to clear next level of competitive exams like CAT, GMAT, IAS,IPS,IRS and go for further studies or change in their job profile. Institutions like Harvard, Emory, CASS, LBS, Lancaster, Yale, Texas A&M, IIM's, ISB, XLRI, IIFT, FMS, Great Lakes, S.P.Jain, MDI etc. welcome these ex-naval officers in their admits willingly since they bring along a wide and diverse experience and add stupendous value to their future occupations and even entrepreneurship by their fresh and mature perspectives.

History 
1927 was a remarkable and epoch making year in the history of modern Indian shipping.
History tells us that India was a vast sea power in olden days. But in India there were no facilities to impart training to Indians to become merchant navy officers till 1927. The Great visionary Sir P. S. Sivaswamy Iyer’s strong advocacy for the cause resulted in acceptance of a resolution on 19 March 1926 by the Central Government to commence the Indian Mercantile Marine, the Ministry of Commerce, accordingly acquired troopship Dufferin and the three-year course for the first batch commenced on Dufferin on 5 December 1927 with 26 cadets. Cadets in the first batch included Admiral Ram Dass Katari, who won the Viceroy's gold medal and later became the first Indian commander-in-chief of the Indian Navy and S. G. Karmarkar (placed 6th in merit) who rose to become a Rear Admiral. T. S.  Dufferin was afloat for a period of 67 years of which 45 years were off Mazgaon pier having trained 2656 cadets. It is a matter of great pride that four Chiefs of Naval Staff of the Indian Navy, many admirals, four Nautical advisors and two chief surveyors with the Government of India had their training at ‘ Dufferin’ besides many senior executives and masters in various shipping companies.
T. S. Rajendra was named after King Rajendra Chola. T. S. Rajendra had been specifically designed and built as a modern training ship by Hindustan Shipyard to train 250 cadets at a time as against 160 earlier.
T. S. Rajendra served illustriously for 21 years by not only training a large number of cadets but also the saloon crew. The Government of India decided with great foresight to set up a shore based academy for training of nautical cadets so that output could be substantially increased. The shore based academy named T. S. Chanakya was inaugurated on 5 April 1993, National Maritime Day.
T. S. Chanakya became operational on 1 August 1993 and teaches the cadets the new order but also makes them upholders of the old ones.

Accommodation 

The campus comprises Administrative block, Scholastic block with class rooms, faculty/staff rooms, library,   laboratories and common rooms, Fire fighting complex, Power station and pump house, Marine engineering  workshop, two hostel blocks, Catering block, Sports ground, Olympic size swimming pool, Laboratories such as: Physics/ Electronics, Computer, Seamanship, Navigation, Global Maritime Distress and Safety System (GMDSS), Environmental Sciences, Marine Engineering Control Station & Chart room, Gymnasium,Mooring Station(Under Construction),own jetty having two FRP rowing boats etc.

Courses
The institute conducts 2 streams of fully residential courses & other modular courses
 3 years course of B.Sc ( Nautical Science )
 1 year DNS Course, leading to B.Sc. (Nautical Science)
 1 week duration of Advanced Fire Fighting Course
 2 weeks duration of GMDSS Course
 Basic modular courses for in house cadets :  a) Fire Prevention Fire Fighting b)Personal Safety & Social Responsibility c) Personal Survival Technique d) Elementary First Aid.
 2 years course of M.Sc ( Commercial Shipping and Logistics)

Notes

References
Indian Maritime University
Directorate General of Shipping, Government of India - Training Ship Chanakya
Naval Maritime Academy (NAMAC) - Joining Merchant Navy

The Tribune, Wednesday, 31 May 2006

Universities and colleges in Maharashtra
Education in Navi Mumbai
Maritime colleges in India
Shipping in India